In finance, the greater fool theory suggests that one can sometimes make money through the purchase of overvalued items with a purchase price drastically exceeding the intrinsic valueif those assets can later be resold at an even higher price. 

In this context, one "fool" might pay for an overpriced asset, hoping that he can sell it to an even "greater fool" and make a profit. This only works as long as there are enough new "greater fools" willing to pay higher and higher prices for the asset. Eventually, investors can no longer deny that the price is out of touch with reality, at which point a sell-off can cause the price to drop significantly until it is closer to its fair value, which in some cases could be zero.

Crowd psychology 

Due to cognitive bias in human behavior, some people are drawn to assets whose price they see increasing, however irrational it might be. This effect is often further exacerbated by herd mentality, whereby people hear stories of others who bought in early and made big profits, causing those who did not buy to feel a fear of missing out. This effect was explained by economics professor Burton Malkiel in his book A Random Walk Down Wall Street:

Examples

In real estate, the greater fool theory can drive investment through the expectation that prices always rise. A period of rising prices may cause lenders to underestimate the risk of default.

In the stock market, the greater fool theory applies when many investors make a questionable investment, with the assumption that they will be able to sell it later to "a greater fool". In other words, they buy something not because they believe that it is worth the price, but rather because they believe that they will be able to sell it to someone else at an even higher price. It is also called survivor investing. It is similar in concept to the Keynesian beauty contest principle of stock investing.

Art is another commodity in which speculation and privileged access drive prices, not intrinsic value.  In November 2013, hedge fund manager Steven A. Cohen of SAC Capital was selling at auction artworks that he had only recently acquired through private transactions. Works included paintings by Gerhard Richter and Rudolf Stingel and a sculpture by Cy Twombly. They were expected to sell for up to $80 million. In reporting the sale, The New York Times noted that "Ever the trader, Mr. Cohen is also taking advantage of today’s active art market where new collectors will often pay far more for artworks than they are worth."

Cryptocurrencies have been characterized as examples of the greater fool theory. Numerous economists, including several Nobel laureates, have described cryptocurrency as having no intrinsic value whatsoever.

In contrast, in times of hyperinflation or in remote regions, the prices of necessities can be so exorbitant that relative to normal markets these prices may seem arbitrary. Yet the local cost of doing business relative to the price in these regions, as well as the necessity to feed and shelter one's self in a hyper-inflationary crisis, justifies through profit or actual benefit the "foolish" price. In these cases, there is no "bubble", even though prices are very high.

See also

 Arbitrage
 Bagholder
 Beanie Babies
 Economic bubble
 Non-fungible token
 Ponzi scheme
 Speculation
 Subjective theory of value
 Tulip mania

References

Investment